This a list of current Philippine Basketball Association team rosters.
  
Flags denote the player's place of birth.

Barangay Ginebra San Miguel

Blackwater Bossing

Converge FiberXers

Magnolia Hotshots

Meralco Bolts

NLEX Road Warriors

NorthPort Batang Pier

Phoenix Super LPG Fuel Masters

Rain or Shine Elasto Painters

San Miguel Beermen

Terrafirma Dyip

TNT Tropang Giga

References
Philippine Basketball Association official website
Asia-Basket - Filipino Basketball

Philippine Basketball Association all-time rosters
Philippine Basketball Association